Pararheinheimera arenilitoris is a Gram-negative, aerobic and rod-shaped  bacterium from the genus of Pararheinheimera which has been isolated from seashore sand from the South Sea in Korea.

References 

Chromatiales
Bacteria described in 2014